Sir William Ernest George Archibald Weigall, 1st Baronet,  (8 December 1874 – 3 June 1952) was a British Conservative politician who served as Governor of South Australia from 9 June 1920 until 30 May 1922.

Family
Weigall was the fifth son of a Victorian artist, Henry Weigall (best known for his portrait of Benjamin Disraeli in 1878–1879), and his wife, Lady Rose Sophia Mary Fane, daughter of John Fane, 11th Earl of Westmorland, and wife Priscilla Anne Wellesley-Pole. Through his mother, he was connected to several powerful aristocratic dynasties. One of his older brothers was the cricketer Gerry Weigall (born Gerald John Villiers Weigall). Two other brothers, Louis and Evelyn, were also first-class cricketers.

He married 16 August 1910 in Metheringham, Lincolnshire, a divorcee, Grace Emily, Baroness von Eckardstein, née Grace Emily Blundell Maple (St. George Hanover Square, London, 1876–1950), only surviving child of the deceased furniture magnate Sir John Blundell Maple, 1st Baronet (1845–1903), who had left a fortune of £2,153,000, and wife Emily Harriet Merryweather. She was the former wife of Baron Hermann von Eckardstein (1864–1933) of the German Embassy (whom she had married in 1896). By his wife, Weigall had one daughter; his wife also suffered several miscarriages, including in Australia.

Their country residence was Englemere House at Ascot in Berkshire.

His daughter Priscilla Crystal Frances Blundell Weigall married on 23 July 1935 Edward Richard Assheton Penn Curzon, CBE (1908–1984), son and heir of Francis Richard Henry Penn Curzon, 5th Earl Howe and wife and cousin Mary Curzon. They had two daughters before they divorced in 1943. She married secondly Robert Coriat, born Harold Isaac Coriat (b. Mogador), son of Abraham Coriat and wife Donna Florence "Flora" Cazes (b. London, Middlesex), daughter of Isaac Juave Cazes and wife Selina Simha or Semah Corcos, who were from Morocco, all Sephardi Jews. Their daughter, British socialite Susan Ann Caroline Coriat married Thomas Evelyn "Tommy" Weber (originally Thomas Ejnar Arkner), a race car driver who also came from a wealthy family. His father was born in Denmark, of Danish and English descent, son of Poul Arkner, born Poul Christian Anderson (b. Denmark) and wife Pamela Joyce Weber (b. Hertford, Hertfordshire), daughter of Reginald Evelyn Weber and wife Joyce Warner. Weigall's great-grandson is British actor Jake Weber.

Early life and military career
Educated at Wellington College, Berkshire, and the Royal Agricultural College, Cirencester, Weigall became an estate manager.

He joined the 3rd (Militia) Battalion of the Northamptonshire Regiment (the Northampton and Rutland Militia). He was promoted to captain on 4 April 1902, when the battalion left for South Africa as reinforcement for what turned out to be the last stages of the Second Boer War. Following the end of the war in June 1902, Weigall and the other men of the 3rd battalion left Cape Town on the SS Scot in early September, and returned to Northampton after arrival in the United Kingdom later the same month. He was later promoted to major. In World War I, he served with the Northamptonshire Regiment and on the Staff, finishing with the rank of lieutenant colonel.

Political career
Captain Archibald G. Weigall unsuccessfully fought the seat of Gainsborough for the Conservatives at the December 1910 general election.

He stood successfully in a by-election at Horncastle in Lincolnshire on 16 February 1911. The by-election was caused by the sitting Conservative MP Lord Willoughby de Eresby, who had held Horncastle at each election since 1895 succeeding to the peerage on the death of his father, Earl Ancaster. He received 4,955 votes, with a majority of 107 over the Liberal, Frederick Caesar Linfield.

He remained an MP until he resigned in 1920 to become Governor.

Governor of South Australia

In 1919, Weigall accepted an appointment as Governor of South Australia. He was appointed  in 1920, and soon left for Adelaide, arriving in June. He very quickly became disenchanted with the State Parliament; he became extremely frustrated with the way in which ministers would spend money before being granted supply, or transfer funds voted for one purpose to another. Although never explicitly calling for the abolition of the States, he did describe the results of the division of power in Australia as being "farcical" and "chaotic", and concluded that "State Governors and State Legislatures are now anachronisms".

Weigall sought leave to resign in December 1921, citing "personal and financial" reasons. The Colonial Office had assured him that the State Government would pick up the wages of his staff. This was not the case, and left Weigall with £300 per annum. His departure prompted Premier Henry Barwell to raise the Governor's salary.

Due to the times, many of the war memorials in country towns around South Australia were opened by him as he travelled around the state, it being only a few years after the end of World War I. These include laying the foundation stone at Burra, unveiling the memorial at Hallett, and opening the new tennis courts at the Memorial Drive Tennis Centre in Adelaide.

Weigall Oval in the suburb of Plympton, and Weigall (formerly Woolshed Flat) along the River Murray were both named in his honour.

Lady Weigall was remembered in South Australia for her support of several worthy causes: she was a very active Patroness of Minda Home, and supporter of the Mothers and Babies' Health Association.
The Lady Weigall hospital in Barmera was named for her.

Later honours
He was appointed High Sheriff of Lincolnshire for 1926–27.

Weigall was created a Baronet, Weigall of Woodhall Spa, in 1938, and was made King of Arms of the Order of St Michael and St George also in 1938. He was appointed High Sheriff of Berkshire for 1944–45.

Since he had no sons, his Baronetcy died with him.

Notes and references

1874 births
1952 deaths
British Army personnel of World War I
People from Ascot, Berkshire
People from Woodhall Spa
Knights Commander of the Order of St Michael and St George
Governors of South Australia
Members of the Parliament of the United Kingdom for English constituencies
UK MPs 1910–1918
UK MPs 1918–1922
Baronets in the Baronetage of the United Kingdom
British Army personnel of the Second Boer War
Northamptonshire Regiment officers
British Yeomanry officers
High Sheriffs of Lincolnshire
High Sheriffs of Berkshire
Alumni of the Royal Agricultural University